Adam Thomas Coakley (born 19 October 1987 in Glasgow) is a Scottish footballer who plays as a striker. He is the son of property tycoon Tom Coakley, who in 2007 expressed an interest in buying Motherwell where his son was a player. Coakley quit football at the age of 22, but has since has returned to play junior football with Glenafton Athletic and Kirkintilloch Rob Roy.

Career

Motherwell
Coakley started his career at Motherwell, becoming a regular scorer for the reserves and made his debut as a late substitute for Jim Hamilton in the 2005 Boxing Day 3–1 victory against Aberdeen. This was not to lead to an immediate breakthrough into the first team and he did not feature again for Motherwell until the following season when he appeared as a substitute in home games against Inverness Caledonian Thistle and St Mirren.  In January 2007 he joined Scottish Third Division side Stenhousemuir for a month on loan, making a single appearance.  Toward the end of the 2006/07 season there was speculation that Coakley's father was interested in buying the club, however this came to nothing and Coakley was released at the end of the season when his contract expired. In total he played around 40 minutes during his 3 substitute appearances.  After being released he had a trial with Partick Thistle of the Scottish First Division.

Morton
However the trial with Partick was unsuccessful and a trial with Scottish First Division side Greenock Morton followed. Failed attempts to sign Paul McGowan from Celtic and Jani Šturm. left them short upfront and Coakley was offered a six-month contract following him scoring in a friendly victory at Raydale Park over Gretna.

Having only made a handful of appearances for Morton, in September 2007 Coakley stepped down a division, going on loan to Alloa Athletic, scoring his first goal for the team in a win against Peterhead. Coakley then went on loan to Stranraer in the Scottish Third Division
, and made his debut against Montrose. His loan spell finished after 5 games, with no goals.

Alloa
He was released by Morton in January 2008 and then played 3 games for Alloa as a trialist before signing a permanent deal with the club until May 2008. He was released at the end of his contract and in June 2008 was signed by Queen's Park manager Gardner Speirs.

Queen's Park
He made his first appearance for Queen's Park as they lost 2–1 to Partick Thistle in the Challenge Cup. He scored his first goal in a 2–1 win over East Fife on 16 August. Coakley scored a famous goal against Celtic in Queen's Park's 2–1 Scottish Cup loss in February 2009, but failed to build on the goal at Celtic Park and only made two more appearances for the Queen's Park first team before being released in May 2009.

Clyde
Coakley undertook pre-season training with former team Alloa, however they were unable to meet his wage demands, and in August 2009 he signed a one-year contract with Clyde in the Scottish Second Division. Coakley left the club by mutual consent in October 2009, after only making 5 appearances, deciding to end his football career in the process.

Junior Football
He returned to football in September 2010 when he signed for Ayrshire junior club Glenafton Athletic.

International
Coakley has been capped at least three times for Scotland under 18s, against Belgium, Northern Ireland and Malta.

References

External links

Living people
1987 births
Footballers from Bellshill
Scottish footballers
Motherwell F.C. players
Stenhousemuir F.C. players
Greenock Morton F.C. players
Alloa Athletic F.C. players
Stranraer F.C. players
Queen's Park F.C. players
Clyde F.C. players
Scottish Premier League players
Scottish Football League players
Association football forwards
Scottish Junior Football Association players
Kirkintilloch Rob Roy F.C. players
Scotland youth international footballers
Glenafton Athletic F.C. players